

Season summary 
Longing for redemption after a 5–years title absence, Inter bet on Giovanni Trapattoni, winner of 6 Scudetti sitting on Juventus' bench. 1986 summer also brought in Milan players such as Daniel Passarella and Gianfranco Matteoli. Autumnal results presented Inter like a competitive team, at least Rummenigge had to give up due to injuries. Trapattoni had already reach UEFA Cup's quarter-finals where he met Goteborg drawing (without goals) the first leg. It forced Inter to win the second but, after gaining the 1–0 with an own goal, team took the equalizer: away goals rule caused Swedish's victory. Season ended with a third place, behind Napoli and coach's former club.

Squad

Goalkeepers
  Walter Zenga
  Astutillo Malgioglio

Defenders
  Giuseppe Bergomi
  Giuseppe Baresi
  Riccardo Ferri
  Andrea Mandorlini
  Corrado Verdelli
  Fabio Calcaterra
  Daniel Passarella
  Luciano Marangon

Midfielders
  Gianfranco Matteoli
  Alberto Rivolta
  Giuseppe Minaudo
  Adriano Piraccini
  Enrico Cucchi
  Marco Tardelli
  Pietro Fanna
  Massimo Pellegrini

Attackers
  Alessandro Altobelli
  Karl-Heinz Rummenigge
  Massimo Ciocci
  Oliviero Garlini

Competitions

Serie A

League table

Matches

Coppa Italia 

First Round

Eightfinals

Quarterfinals

UEFA Cup 

First round

Second round

Eightfinals

Quarterfinals

Statistics

Team statistics

Players statistics 
Appearances and goals in league.

Ferri (30); Mandorlini (30/1); Matteoli (30/1); G.Baresi (29/1); Zenga (29/−16); Altobelli (28/11); Bergomi (28/2); Fanna (28/3); Piraccini (28); Tardelli (24); Passarella (23/3); Garlini (20/4); Calcaterra (14); Rummenigge (14/3); Cucchi (13); Ciocci (4/1); Marangon (3); Malgioglio (1/−1); Minaudo (1).

References

Sources
  RSSSF - Italy 1986/87

Inter Milan seasons
Inter